James Westland (21 July 1916 – February 1972) was a footballer who played in the Football League for Mansfield Town and Stoke City.

Career
Born in Aberdeen Westland started playing football for Scottish Junior clubs Inchgarth and Banks O' Dee before joining Aberdeen in 1934 along with his brother Douglas. He played three times for the "Dons" scoring twice and impressed watching scouts from English Football League side Stoke City who signed Westland and his brother. His time at the "Potters" saw him playing alongside greats such as Stanley Matthews, Tommy Sale and Freddie Steele and Westland found it hard to establish himself into the starting eleven. He scored four goals in 14 matches in 1935–36 and played 23 games in 1936–37 again scoring four goals. In 1937–38 he played in 25 matches scoring seven goals including a hat-trick in an 8–1 victory over Derby County. In 1938–39 he played just twice scoring once. He continued to play for the club during the World War II before joining Mansfield Town in 1946.

Personal life
His brother Douglas was also a footballer who played for Aberdeen and Stoke City.

Career statistics

References

Scottish footballers
Aberdeen F.C. players
Mansfield Town F.C. players
Stoke City F.C. players
English Football League players
1916 births
1972 deaths
Footballers from Aberdeen
Scottish Football League players
Banks O' Dee F.C. players
Association football inside forwards